Alejandro Armenta Mier is a Mexican politician who is currently the president of the Mexican Senate since 2022. He is a senator from the state of Puebla and is affiliated with MORENA.

References

Morena (political party) politicians
Living people
Year of birth missing (living people)
Mexican people of Lebanese descent